Benefit is the third studio album by the British rock band Jethro Tull, released in April 1970. It was the first Tull album to include pianist and organist John Evan – though he was not yet considered a permanent member of the group – and the last to include bass guitarist Glenn Cornick, who was fired from the band upon completion of touring for the album. It was recorded at Morgan Studios, the same studio where the band recorded its previous album Stand Up; however, they experimented with more advanced recording techniques.

Frontman Ian Anderson said that he considers Benefit to be a much darker album than Stand Up, owing to the pressures of an extensive U.S. tour and frustration with the music business.

Production
Guitarist Martin Barre said that Benefit was a lot easier to make than previous albums, as the success of Stand Up allowed the musicians more artistic latitude.

Bassist Glenn Cornick stated that the band's intention was to capture a more "live" feeling as "I felt the last one sounded like a group of session musicians performing various songs. It was pretty cold."
	  	
Benefit incorporated studio techniques such as reverse recording (flute and piano tracks on "With You There to Help Me"), and manipulating the tape speed (guitar on "Play in Time"). In a 1970 interview Anderson noted that the addition of keyboardist John Evan had changed the band's style: "John has added a new dimension musically and I can write more freely now. In fact anything is possible with him at the keyboard".

Musical style
Ian Anderson said that Benefit was a "guitar riff" album, recorded in a year in which artists like Cream, Jimi Hendrix and Led Zeppelin were becoming more riff-oriented. Anderson also noted that Benefit is "a rather dark and stark album and, although it has a few songs on it that are rather okay, I don't think it has the breadth, variety or detail that Stand Up has. But it was an evolution in terms of the band playing as 'a band.'" Overall, Anderson considered the album "a natural part of the group's evolution".

According to Martin Barre "To Cry You a Song" was a response to Blind Faith's "Had to Cry Today", "although you couldn't compare the two; nothing was stolen ... The riff crossed over the bar in a couple of places and Ian and I each played guitars on the backing tracks. It was more or less live in the studio with a couple of overdubs and a solo. Ian played my Gibson SG and I played a Les Paul on it."

Releases
The UK and the US release are different. The US version (with flute) of "Teacher" was placed on side two of the album, and the track "Alive and Well and Living In" was excluded. In the UK, "Teacher" was the B-side of the non-album single "The Witch's Promise", and was without a flute.

In 2013, the Collector's Edition of Benefit was released. It contains bonus tracks mixed by Steven Wilson, a disc with mono and stereo mixes of rare and previously unreleased versions of tracks and singles and an audio-only DVD that includes a surround sound mix of the original album. The Collector's Edition also includes a booklet featuring an 8,000-word essay written by Martin Webb, as well as interviews with band members and a selection of photos, some previously unseen.

For the 50th anniversary of the album, an enhanced edition was released in 2021, consisting of four CDs and two DVDs.

Critical reception

Critics were generally unimpressed with Benefit upon its release. Rolling Stone called the album "lame and dumb". Disc and Music Echo was also unimpressed but recognized the band's quality: "This album doesn't advance by such a drastic leap as Stand Up did from This Was. It's more like the Jethro Tull we've seen and heard for the past year. It seems to be a remarkably long album, and shows what an exciting group this is. Exciting because they can have quite long guitar breaks and still retain a very tight and together sound". The Village Voice critic Robert Christgau appreciated the riffs around which all the songs were constructed, but wasn't impressed by the lyrics that he judged hard to recall.

Legacy
AllMusic and Record Collector'''s much-later reviews were more positive in accepting the album's style. Bruce Eder stated that: "Most of the songs on Benefit display pleasant, delectably folk-like melodies attached to downbeat, slightly gloomy, but dazzlingly complex lyrics, with Barre's guitar adding enough wattage to keep the hard rock listeners very interested. 'To Cry You a Song', 'Son', and 'For Michael Collins, Jeffrey and Me' all defined Tull's future sound: Barre's amp cranked up to ten (especially on 'Son'), coming in above Anderson's acoustic strumming, a few unexpected changes in tempo, and Anderson spouting lyrics filled with dense, seemingly profound imagery and statements." Record Collector reviewer, analysing the Collector's Edition of 2013, praised the Steven Wilson remix and wrote: "Benefit forms the perfect bridge between the rolling, tumbling Tull of old and the tightly braided riffs and prickly lyrics presented by Aqualung." Paul Stump, in his History of Progressive Rock, said that Benefit "maintained the invention (and sales) of its predecessor, once again teasing unexpected emotional reflexes from time-honoured voicings and rhythms to signpost something that, if not a wholly new kind of pop song, at least offered the listener new bearings in his or her search."

Track listing
1970 UK release

1970 US release

2013 A Collector's Edition (3 Discs)

Personnel
Jethro Tull
 Ian Anderson – vocals, acoustic guitar, electric guitar (uncredited), flute, balalaika, keyboards, production
 Martin Barre – electric guitar
 Glenn Cornick – bass guitar, Hammond organ (uncredited)
 Clive Bunker – drums, percussion

Additional musicians
 Dee Palmer – orchestral arrangements
 John Evan – piano, organ

Production
 Robin Black – engineer
 Terry Ellis – cover design, executive producer
 Ruan O'Lochlainn – cover design, photography

ChartsBenefit'' was the first million record seller from Jethro Tull.

Album

Singles

Certifications

References

External links
 Jethro Tull - Benefit (1970/2001 Version with Bonus Tracks) album review by Bruce Eder, credits & releases at AllMusic.com
 Jethro Tull - Benefit (1970) album releases & credits at Discogs.com
 Jethro Tull - Benefit (1970) album review by BludgeonySteve at SputnikMusic.com
 Jethro Tull - Benefit (1970/2001 Remastered Version) album to be listened as stream at Play.Spotify.com
 Jethro Tull - Benefit (1970/2013 Steven Wilson Remix & Remaster) album to be listened as stream at Play.Spotify.com

Jethro Tull (band) albums
1970 albums
Chrysalis Records albums
Reprise Records albums
Albums produced by Ian Anderson
Albums recorded at Morgan Sound Studios